Eartha Cumings (born 11 June 1999) is a Scottish footballer who plays as a goalkeeper for Women's Super League club Everton on loan from Liverpool and the Scotland national team.

Life
Cumings was born in 1999 in Scotland. She went to university where she studied Ancient History.

Playing career

Spartans, 2014–2018
Cumings started her senior career at age 14 with the Scottish Women's Premier League (SWPL) Spartans, a  club which she joined age 10.

Bristol City, 2018–2020 

Cumings subsequently joined Bristol City in the FA WSL alongside fellow Scottish international Lucy Graham prior to the 2018–2019 season.

Charlton Athletic, 2020–2022 
In July 2021, Charlton announced its intentions to become a fully professional club. Cumings then became the first player in history to sign a professional full time contract with Charlton WFC. Manager Karen Hills signed her although she had already played thirteen matches before signing the contract. Her debut season saw her named Players’ Player of the Year, while in May she was named Charlton’s Player of the Year after an impressive campaign that included nine clean sheets and a run of almost 15 hours without conceding a goal in all competitions.

Liverpool F.C., 2022– 
On 14 July 2022,Cumings joined the Reds after two impressive seasons with Charlton Athletic Women in the FA Women’s Championship.

Everton, 2023 
On 4th March 2023 Cumings joined Liverpool rival team Everton on an emergency goalkeeper loan after Emily Ramsey sustained an ankle injury while on international duty with England. Everton confirmed the signing of Cumings on their website.

International career
Cumings has represented Scotland at the under-16, under-17 and under-19 levels. In May 2021, she was named to the Scottish senior national team for the first time, ahead of friendlies against Northern Ireland and Wales in June 2021. Cumings made her full international debut during the 2022 Pinatar Cup, in a goalless draw with Hungary.

Personal life

During a routine operation, Cumings developed compartment syndrome and almost had to have both of her legs amputated. Cumings commented on the experience while speaking to The Guardian, "I had to have numerous surgeries to repair the injury and spent a good bit of time on crutches. Nearly losing the opportunity to play football changed my outlook. Even if I’m just sitting on the bench, I still think that’s a huge achievement."

References

External links
 Eartha Cummings (sic) on the Scottish Football Association's official website

1999 births
Living people
Scottish women's footballers
Bristol City W.F.C. players
Women's Super League players
Spartans W.F.C. players
Charlton Athletic W.F.C. players
Liverpool F.C. Women players
Women's Championship (England) players
Women's association football goalkeepers
Scotland women's international footballers